The 2013 AIHL season was the 14th season of the Australian Ice Hockey League (AIHL). It ran from 20 April 2013 until 1 September 2013, with the Goodall Cup finals following on the 7 and 8 September. The Sydney Ice Dogs won both the H Newman Ried Trophy for finishing first in the regular season, and the Goodall Cup after defeating the Newcastle North Stars in the final.

Teams
In 2013 the AIHL had 8 teams competing in the league.

League business
In October 2012 it was announced that the 2013 season would be played with eight teams as the Gold Coast Blue Tongues' licence was suspended due to the team being unable to secure a home venue for 2013. The Blue Tongues were forced out of their arena during the 2012 season when the AIHL deemed it to not be up to specifications for the league forcing the team to temporarily relocate to Brisbane for the remainder of the season. It was also announced that the suspension on the Sydney Ice Dogs had been lifted allowing the team to ice four imports again. The Ice Dogs were restricted to three for the 2012 season by the league due to breaches of the league's code of conduct. Following the Annual General Meeting (AGM) it was announced that the third period of play has been increased from 15 minutes to 20 minutes, while the first two remain 15 minutes in length. The change was in response to fans calling for the league to align itself with international hockey which plays three 20 minute periods. The Melbourne Mustangs revealed their new logo and jerseys for the start of the season featuring a redesigned mustang horse, holding an ice hockey stick. The new jerseys include a white home jersey, a black away jersey and an orange third jersey which is being released as off-ice apparel only. The Sydney Ice Dogs also revealed their new jerseys with an aqua green away jersey and a white home jersey. The change in colours was made as part of a deal with corporate naming sponsor Reach Crane Trucks and will be in place for three years, the duration of their deal with Reach Crane Trucks. Their previous colours of maroon, yellow, blue, black and white will remain as the team's corporate colours.

On 17 February the AIHL announced that it had entered into a partnership with Fox Sports in which a game of the week will be aired on the network as part of a 60-minute program which also includes league and state federation news and AIHL highlights. The Canberra Knights held an exhibition game on 23 March 2013 with the team competing against a team of former Knights' players for the Soldier On charity. The Knights won the game 6–5.

Personnel changes
Following the AGM the AIHL announced that Tyler Lovering had been re-elected to the commission as Assistant Commissioner until 2014. Ben Kiely and Alexandra Lata had both received a one-year extension to their terms on the commission, with Lata being appointed Deputy Commissioner. The AIHL have also elected Robert Bannerman and Joshua Chye to the commission to serve as Commissioner and Assistant Commissioner respectively. In December 2012 the Melbourne Mustangs announced that they had appointed Brad Vigon as head coach, replacing Steve Laforet who had been fired at the end of the 2012 season. Following the end of the 2012 season the Melbourne Ice announced that both president Andy Lamrock and head coach Paul Watson had stepped down from their positions. In November 2012 the Ice announced that former Ice Hockey Victoria president Emma Poynton as successor to Lamrock as the club's president. In February 2013 the Ice appointed assistant coach Sandy Gardner to the head coach position.

Player transfers

Players signed

Players lost

Regular season
The regular season started on 20 April 2013 and ran through to 1 September 2013 before the top four teams compete in the Goodall Cup playoff series.

The Sydney Ice Dogs won the H Newman Reid Trophy after finishing the regular season with the most points, 61. Newcastle North Stars' Jeff Martens won the Most Valuable Player award, after finishing as the league's top scorer with 67 points. Anthony Kimlin of the Sydney Ice Dogs was named the Australian Player of the Year and Best Goaltender, finishing with a save percentage 0.919. The Sydney Bears' Cameron Todd won the award for Best Rookie and John Gordon of the Melbourne Ice was named Best Defenceman.

April

May

June

July

August & September

Standings

Source

Statistics

Scoring leaders
List shows the ten top skaters sorted by points, then goals.

Leading goaltenders
Only the top five goaltenders, based on save percentage with a minimum 40% of the teams ice time.

Season awards

Below lists the 2013 AIHL regular season award winners.

Source

Goodall Cup playoffs
The 2013 playoffs started on 7 September 2013, with the Goodall Cup final held on 8 September. Following the end of the regular season the top four teams advanced to the playoff series. All three games were held at the Medibank Icehouse in Docklands, Victoria, the home of the Melbourne Ice and Melbourne Mustangs. The series was a single game elimination with the two winning semi-finalists advancing to the Goodall Cup final. The Sydney Ice Dogs won the Goodall Cup (2nd title) with a 6-2 victory over the Newcastle North Stars. Anthony Kimlin’s defensive efforts for the Ice Dogs earned him the award of Most Valuable Player (MVP) for the finals series.

Semi-finals
All times are UTC+10:00

Final

References

External links
The Australian Ice Hockey League

2013 in ice hockey
2013 in Australian sport
2013